Trzygłów  is a village in the administrative district of Gmina Gryfice, within Gryfice County, West Pomeranian Voivodeship, in north-western Poland.

The village has a population of 670.

See also 

 History of Pomerania

Notable residents
 Adolf von Thadden (1921–1996), German politician

References

Villages in Gryfice County